Heir Island, also known as Hare Island or Inishodriscol, is an island in southwest County Cork, Ireland. It has a year-round population of around 25–30. The island is 2.5 km long and 1.5 km wide. It is the fourth-largest of Carbery's Hundred Isles, after Sherkin Island, Clear Island and Long Island. It is near Cunnamore Pier, which is its main access point.

History 
The island was once inhabited by approximately 400 people. The McCarthy and O'Neill families are known for living on this island for years, the latter in fact owned the original island post office. To make a living on the Island the inhabitants either fished or farmed the land but were often unable to make an adequate living, as a result many of the young people emigrated to England, USA and Australia. There are still many descendants of the original islanders living and working on the island. As a result of the emigration, many of the houses were sold in the 1960s and those who bought them often restored the original houses as holiday homes which visitors can see dotted around the island.

Today 

There is a small hamlet on the island; the old main residential area known as Paris which is noted for the bridge, which is only wide enough for one car to pass. This hamlet was once the centre of the island's fishing activities due to the fact that the landing, pickling and barrelling of the day's catch was done there.

Many of the ruins on the island reflect the years when the island's population was higher. The schoolhouse and schoolmaster's house are on the island's main road. The island also has 2 piers and today the shop's location is in Burke's (home of the Roaringwater Sailing School).

The island has a wildlife preserve and several beaches. These include the Sandy Beach (or Trá Bán), a sandy stretch on the east side of the island which faces Baltimore. The beach is used as a landing point for small craft during the summer months.

The main way to get to the island is via the island ferry, the M.V Thresher, which departs from Cunnamore point to the island's main pier 6 times a day, every 2 hours, from 8am to 6pm during the summer. This ferry also operates routes from adjacent islands and Baltimore upon special request. Another ferry which services the islands is the M.V. Boy Colm which provides ferry services from Baltimore and Cunnamore throughout the summer months of July and August to Heir Island and to Sherkin Island. Unscheduled and special sailings to other destinations on this vessel are upon request. For angling trips, island and "eco" tours, the M.V. Norvic provides a service within Roaringwater Bay.

One restaurant on the island is noted for its fresh "catch of the day"; which varies depending on season. Shrimp, lobster, salmon, crab and a variety of local fish are served at the restaurant called, "The Island Cottage". A special evening ferry departs from Cunnamore at 8pm and returning at 12 midnight, and like the restaurant is by booking only.

Heir Island is supplied with mains power from the mainland through a submarine power cable.

Geography 
Over 200 species of wildflower grow on Heir Island. The island has many beaches, as well as cliffs on the most south-westerly point known as The Dún. The island is surrounded by Carbery's Hundred Isles and has a view of Mount Gabriel near Schull. It has  of fertile land, some of which is set-aside.

Every year there is a special mass for all the children that died on the island during famine or from illness, at the children's famine memorial. This memorial is located near the Old-Schoolhouse in the centre of the island and is marked with a large cross.

Tourism 
The permanent population of Heir Island is only 25–30, but during summer months when the holiday homes are occupied the population increases to around 150. Although the small island does not have a pub, it has B&Bs, holiday rentals, an art gallery, a sailing school and outdoor activities camp, a holistic therapy centre, one permanent restaurant and one pop-up restaurant which is located in the Sailing School. Fresh bread is also made at the Firehouse Bakery where baking courses are also held. The island is also home to a handful of artists, and their work is shown in the galleries on the island.

The island is also a destination for bird watchers, due to its mixture of eco-systems; coastal, forest, marsh and heathland.

Heir Island is one of the seven inhabited West Cork Islands.

See also 
Schull
Carbery's Hundred Isles
List of islands of Ireland

References

External links
 HeirIsland.ie Official Website of Heir Island Community Council

Islands of County Cork
Ruins in the Republic of Ireland